Bennie Thompson (born February 10, 1963) is a former American football safety who played in the National Football League (NFL) and Canadian Football League (CFL). He went to the Pro Bowl after the 1991 and 1998 seasons as a special teams player. Thompson played for the Winnipeg Blue Bombers of the CFL(Grey cup Champion 1988) and the New Orleans Saints, Kansas City Chiefs, Cleveland Browns, and the Baltimore Ravens of the NFL. Thompson is best known for his special teams contributions.

College career
He played at Grambling.

Professional career

New Orleans Saints
He signed with the team after his three-year stint in the Canadian Football League. In 1991, he was selected to the Pro Bowl as a special teamer.

Kansas City Chiefs
He spent two seasons in Kansas city. In 1992, Thompson recorded a career high 4 interceptions.

Cleveland Browns
He played in Cleveland and only for two seasons but was coached by Bill Belichick.  He tied for the team lead in ST tackles with 21 in 1994.

Baltimore Ravens
He played in Baltimore in four seasons. In 1998, he was selected to the Pro Bowl as a special teamer. It was his second career Pro Bowl selection.

In 1999, he led the team with 24 ST tackles.

References

1963 births
Living people
Players of American football from New Orleans
Players of Canadian football from New Orleans
American football safeties
Grambling State Tigers football players
American players of Canadian football
Canadian football defensive backs
Winnipeg Blue Bombers players
New Orleans Saints players
Kansas City Chiefs players
Cleveland Browns players
Baltimore Ravens players
National Conference Pro Bowl players
Ed Block Courage Award recipients